Ellen Brekken (born 20 June 1985) is a Norwegian jazz musician who plays upright bass, bass guitar, and the tuba.

Biography 
Brekken was born in Tynset, Norway. She attended the Toneheim Folk High School in 2005, and completed a bachelor's degree in Improvised Music on the jazz program at the Norwegian Academy of Music in Oslo from 2006 to 2010, including a period of exchange studies in Cape Town, South Africa. She is leading a 7-mans folk/jazz big band called Gruvar with co-composer Lars Jakop Rudjord and she has also led her own Ellen Brekken Quartet including Dag-Filip Roaldsnes (piano), Eskil Sæter (guitar) and Jon Audun Baar (drums). Brekken also collaborates within Hedvig Mollestad Trio including with Ivar Loe Bjørnstad, releasing the albums Shoot! (2011), All of Them Witches (2013), "Enfant Terrible" (2014), Black Stabat Mater (2016) and the live album Evil in Oslo (2016)  . For the album "All of them witches" they were nominated to the Norwegian "Grammy" award in the rock category. She also plays in the band MAAR, which play Norwegian folk music and was nominated for Folkelarmprisen for their album "Vrangsvevd". She has been working a lot for Concerts Norway (Rikskonsertene), different theatres in Norway (Nationaltheatret, Folketeatret, Oslo Nye teater, Trøndelag teater) in addition to playing with musicians such as Espen Rud, Staffan William-Olsson, Frode Nymo, Bugge Wesseltoft, Frode Alnæs, Jens Wendelboe, Aasmund Nordstoga, Ine Hoem and she is currently a member of Caledonia jazzband and plays with artists such as, Lise Hvoslef and Kjetil Flatland. She also leads the band Du og jeg og vi 2 - 3 - 4, playing music for kids.

Discography 
Within Hedvig Mollestad Trio including with Ivar Loe Bjørnstad
2011: Shoot! (Rune Grammofon)
2013: All of Them Witches (Rune Grammofon)
2014: Enfant Terrible! (Rune Grammofon)
2016: Black Stabat Mater (Rune Grammofon)
2016: Evil In Oslo (Rune Grammofon)

Within MAAR
2014             Vrangsvevd – MAAR – (ta:lik)
2015             Epleslang - MAAR - (ta:lik)

Other
2012             Crazy Heart (EP) – Sigrun and the Kitchen Band (HummingBird records) 
2013             Uten at du vet det – Sigrun Loe Sparboe (Tylden & Co AS)  
2013             Av en sliters memoarer - Erik Lukashaugen - (Øksekar) 
2013             The Island (EP)– Ine Hoem (Impeller recordings) 
2014             Mapping the coincidence (EP)– Lise Hvoslef (Lise Hvoslef Records)
2015	        Tel si ega tid - Erik Lukashaugen (Øksekar)
2015	        Ein song til deg - Kjetil Flatland (Grappa musikkforlag)
2016	        Finnskogvegen - Erik Lukashaugen (Øksekar)
2016	        Just Being Part - Lise Hvoslef (Lise Hvoslef recordings)
2016	        Syng min sorg, gråt min glede - Bjørn Anders Hermundstad (Kirkelig kulturverksted)
2016	        Stifinner - Tone Hulbækmo (Heilo)
2017	        Hyttetankar - Kjetil Flatland (Grappa musikkforlag)
2017	        Out of silence - FriEnsemblet (Giraffa records)
2017	        Tanken er fri - Trond Granlund (Trond Granlund records)
2017	        Appily Ever After - Ava Freddy (Pretty young things)
2017	        Hildersyn - Irene Tillung (Heilo)
2017	        Krokodille i baksetet - Du og jeg og vi 2 - 3 - 4 (Curling Legs)

References

External links

Hedvig Mollestad Trio – Gun And The E-Kid – Steinkjerfestivalen 2012 on YouTube
Hedvig Mollestad Trio – European Tour 2013 on YouTube

1985 births
Living people
Norwegian women musicians
Norwegian Academy of Music alumni
Norwegian jazz upright-bassists
Norwegian jazz bass guitarists
Jazz double-bassists
Norwegian jazz composers
Musicians from Tynset
Women bass guitarists
21st-century women musicians
21st-century double-bassists
21st-century Norwegian bass guitarists